Dagens it is a biweekly newspaper covering the IT business sector published by Norges Handels og Sjøfartstidende (NHST) in Oslo, Norway. The newspaper was founded as Business in 1992 but was bought by NHST in 2005 and relaunched as a supplement of the business newspaper Dagens Næringsliv.

Business newspapers
Newspapers published in Oslo
Publications established in 1992
1992 establishments in Norway